Marius Barnard and Jim Thomas were the defending champions at the doubles event of the Heineken Open tennis tournament, held in Auckland, New Zealand, but only Barnard competed that year with David Adams.

Adams and Barnard lost in the first round to Ellis Ferreira and Rick Leach.

Jonas Björkman and Todd Woodbridge won in the final 7–6(7–5), 7–6(9–7) against Martín García and Cyril Suk.

Seeds
Champion seeds are indicated in bold text while text in italics indicates the round in which those seeds were eliminated.

  Jonas Björkman /  Todd Woodbridge (champions)
  Mahesh Bhupathi /  Jeff Tarango (semifinals)
  Ellis Ferreira /  Rick Leach (semifinals)
  Martín García /  Cyril Suk (final)

Draw

References

External links
 ITF – tournament edition details
 Doubles draw

2002 Heineken Open
Doubles